In calculus, the quotient rule is a method of finding the derivative of a function that is the ratio of two differentiable functions.

It is provable in many ways by using other derivative rules.

Examples

Example 1: Basic example 

Given , let , then using the quotient rule:

Example 2: Derivative of tangent function 

Reciprocal rule 

The reciprocal rule is a special case of the quotient rule in which the numerator . Applying the quotient rule gives

Proofs

Proof from derivative definition and limit properties

Proof using implicit differentiation

Proof using the reciprocal rule or chain rule
Let   Then the product rule givesTo evaluate the derivative in the second term, apply the reciprocal rule, or the power rule along with the chain rule: 

Substituting the result into the expression gives

Proof by logarithmic differentiation 
This works because , which justifies taking the absolute value of the functions for logarithmic differentiation.

Higher order derivatives
Implicit differentiation can be used to compute the th derivative of a quotient (partially in terms of its first  derivatives).  For example, differentiating  twice (resulting in ) and then solving for  yields

See also

References

Articles containing proofs
Differentiation rules
Theorems in analysis
Theorems in calculus